Varosha (or Kapalı Maraş) is the southern quarter of the Famagusta, a de jure  territory of Cyprus, currently under the control of Northern Cyprus. Varosha has a population of 226 in the 2011 Northern Cyprus census.

Etymology
The name of Varosha derives from the Turkish word  ('suburb'). The place where Varosha is located now was empty fields in which animals grazed.

History
In the early 1970s, Famagusta was the number-one tourist destination in Cyprus. To cater to the increasing number of tourists, many new high-rise buildings and hotels were constructed. During its heyday, Varosha was not only the number-one tourist destination in Cyprus, but between 1970 and 1974, it was one of the most popular tourist destinations in the world and was a favorite destination of such celebrities as Elizabeth Taylor, Richard Burton, Raquel Welch, and Brigitte Bardot.

Before 1974, Varosha was the modern tourist area of the Famagusta city. Its Greek Cypriot inhabitants fled during the Turkish invasion of Cyprus in 1974, when the city of Famagusta came under Turkish control, and it has remained abandoned ever since. In 1984 a U.N. resolution called for the handover of the city to UN control and said that only the original inhabitants, who were forced out, could resettle in the town.

Entry to Varosha was opened to civilians in 2017.

Turkish Cypriot rule
In August 1974, the Turkish Army advanced as far as the Green Line, which is the present-day border between the Greek Cypriots and Turkish Cypriots, and controlled and fenced Varosha. Just hours before the Greek Cypriot and Turkish armies met in combat on the streets of Famagusta, the entire Greek Cypriot population fled to Paralimni, Dherynia, and Larnaca, fearing a massacre. The evacuation was aided and orchestrated by the nearby British military base. Paralimni has since become the modern-day capital of the Famagusta province of Greek Cypriot-led Cyprus.

The Turkish Army has allowed the entry of only Turkish military and United Nations personnel since 2017.

One such settlement plan was the Annan Plan to reunify the island that provided for the return of Varosha to the original residents. But this was rejected by Greek Cypriots in a 2004 referendum. The UN Security Council Resolution 550 states that it "considers attempts to settle any part of Varosha by people other than its inhabitants as inadmissible and calls for the transfer of this area to the administration of the United Nations".

The European Court of Human Rights awarded between €100,000 and €8,000,000 to eight Greek Cypriots for being deprived of their homes and properties as a result of the 1974 invasion. The case was filed jointly by businessman Constantinos Lordos and others, with the principal judgement in the Lordos case dating back to November 2010. The court ruled that, in the case of eight of the applicants, Turkey had violated Article 1 of Protocol 1 of the European Convention on Human Rights on the right of peaceful enjoyment of one's possessions, and in the case of seven of the applicants, Turkey had violated Article 8 on the right to respect for private and family life.

In the absence of human habitation and maintenance, buildings continue to decay. Over time, parts of the city have begun to be reclaimed by nature as metal corrodes, windows are broken, and plants work their roots into the walls and pavement and grow wild in old window boxes. In 2014, the BBC reported that sea turtles were observed nesting on the beaches in the city.

During the Cyprus Missile Crisis (1997–1998), the Turkish Cypriot leader, Rauf Denktaş, threatened to take over Varosha if the Cypriot government did not back down.

Features
The main features of Varosha included John F. Kennedy Avenue, a street which ran from close to the port of Famagusta, through Varosha and parallel to Glossa beach. Along JFK Avenue, there were many well known high rise hotels including the King George Hotel, The Asterias Hotel, The Grecian Hotel, The Florida Hotel, and The Argo Hotel which was the favourite hotel of Elizabeth Taylor. The Argo Hotel is located near the end of JFK Avenue, looking towards Protaras and Fig Tree Bay. Another major street in Varosha was Leonidas, a major street that came off JFK Avenue and headed west towards Vienna Corner. Leonidas was a major shopping and leisure street in Varosha, consisting of bars, restaurants, nightclubs, and a Toyota car dealership.

Court cases 
According to Greek Cypriots, 425 plots exist on the Varosha beach front, which extends from the Contandia hotel to the Golden Sands hotel. The complete number of plots in Varosha are 6082.

There are 281 cases of Greek Cypriots who filed to the Immovable Property Commission (IPC) of Northern Cyprus for compensation.

In 2020, Greek Cypriot Demetrios Hadjihambis filed a lawsuit seeking state compensation for financial losses.

Reopening to civilian inhabitation

The population of Varosha was 226 in the 2011 Northern Cyprus census.

In 2017, Varosha's beach was opened for the exclusive use of Turks (both Turkish Cypriots and Turkish nationals).

In 2019, the Government of Northern Cyprus announced it would open Varosha to settlement. On 14 November 2019, Ersin Tatar, the prime minister of Northern Cyprus, announced that Northern Cyprus aims to open Varosha by the end of 2020.

On 25 July 2019, Varosha Inventory Commission of Northern Cyprus started its inventory analysis on the buildings and other infrastructure in Varosha.

On 9 December 2019, Ibrahim Benter, the Director-General of the Turkish Cypriot EVKAF religious foundation's administration, declared all of Maraş/Varosha to be the property of EVKAF. Benter said "EVKAF can sign renting contracts with Greek Cypriots if they accept that the fenced-off town belongs to the Evkaf."

In 2019–20, inventory studies of buildings by the Government of Northern Cyprus were concluded. On 15 February 2020, the Turkish Bar Association organised a round table meeting at the Sandy Beach Hotel in Varosha, which was attended by Turkish officials (Vice President Fuat Oktay and Justice Minister Abdulhamit Gül), Turkish Cypriot officials, representatives of the Turkish Cypriot religious foundation Evkaf, and Turkish and Turkish Cypriot lawyers.

On 22 February 2020, Cyprus declared it would veto European Union funds to Turkish Cypriots if Varosha were opened to settlement.

On 6 October 2020, Ersin Tatar, the Prime Minister of Northern Cyprus, announced that the beach area of Varosha would reopen to the public on 8 October 2020. Turkey's president, Recep Tayyip Erdoğan, said Turkey fully supported the decision. The move came ahead of the 2020 Northern Cypriot presidential election, in which Tatar was a candidate. Deputy Prime Minister Kudret Özersay, who had worked on the reopening previously, said that this was not a full reopening of the area, that this was just a unilateral election stunt by Tatar. His People's Party withdrew from the Tatar cabinet, leading to the collapse of the Turkish Cypriot government. The EU's diplomatic chief condemned the plan and described it as a "serious violation" of the U.N. ceasefire agreement. In addition, he asked Turkey to stop this activity. The U.N. Secretary-General expressed concern over Turkey's decision.

On 8 October 2020, some parts of  Varosha were opened from the Officers' Club of Turkish and Turkish Cypriot Army to the Golden Sands Hotel.

In November 2020, the Turkish President Recep Tayyip Erdoğan and Turkey's ambassador to Nicosia, visited Varosha. In addition, the main avenue in Varosha has been renamed after Semih Sancar, Chief of the General Staff of Turkey from 1973 to 1978, a period including the 1974 Turkish invasion of Cyprus.

The European Parliament on 27 November, asked Turkey to reverse its decision to re-open part of Varosha and resume negotiations aimed at resolving the Cyprus problem on the basis of a bi-communal, bi-zonal federation and called on the European Union to impose sanctions against Turkey, if things do not change. Turkey rejected the resolution, adding that Turkey will continue to protect both its own rights and those of Turkish Cypriots. The Turkish Republic of Northern Cyprus presidency also condemned the resolution.

On 20 July 2021, Tatar, the president of Northern Cyprus announced the start of the 2nd phase of the opening of Varosha. He encouraged Greek Cypriots to apply Immovable Property Commission of the Turkish Republic of Northern Cyprus to claim their properties back if they have any such rights.

Bilal Aga Mosque, constructed in 1821 and taken out of service in 1974, was re-opened on 23 July 2021.

In response to a decision by the government of Turkish Cyprus, the presidential statement of the United Nations Security Council dated on 23 July said that settling any part of the abandoned Cypriot suburb of Varosha, "by people other than its inhabitants, is 'inadmissible'." The same day, Turkey rejected the presidential statement of the UNSC on Maras (Varosha), and said that these statements were based on Greek-Greek Cypriot propaganda, were groundless and unfounded claims, and inconsistent with the realities on the Island. On 24 July 2021, the presidency of Northern Cyprus condemned the presidential statement of the UNSC dated on 23 July, and stated that "We see and condemn it as an attempt to create an obstacle for the property-rights-holders in Varosha to achieve their rights".

By 1 January 2022, nearly 400,000 people had visited Varosha since its opening to civilians on 6 October 2020.

On 19 May 2022, Northern Cyprus opened a 600m long X 400m wide stretch of beach on the Golden Sands beach (from the King George Hotel to the Oceania Building) in Varosha for commercial use. Sun beds and umbrellas were installed.

UNFICYP said it would raise the decision taken by Turkish Cypriot authorities to open that stretch of beach in Varosha with the Security Council, spokesperson for the peacekeeping force Aleem Siddique said on Friday. The UN announced its "position on Varosha is unchanged and we are monitoring the situation closely".

In October 2022, the Turkish Cypriots announced that public institutions will be opened in the city.

Cultural References 
Varosha was analyzed by Alan Weisman in his book The world without us as an example of the unstoppable power of nature.

Filmmaker Greek Cypriot Michael Cacoyannis described the city and interviewed its exiled citizens in the film Attilas '74, produced in 1975.

In 2021, the Belarusian group Main-De-Gloire dedicates a song to this city that has become a ghostly place.

Gallery

References

External links
BBC News - Varosha: The abandoned tourist resort
Hopes for reunification NYTimes, 2015
Nearly 50 Years On, a Forbidden Seaside Ghost Town is about to Re-Open
The abandoned town in Cyprus

Former populated places in Cyprus
Ghost towns in Asia
Ghost towns in Europe
Famagusta
Greek Cypriot villages depopulated during the 1974 Turkish invasion of Cyprus
Modern ruins